FSV Salmrohr is a German association football club in the village of Salmrohr, Rhineland-Palatinate. Founded in 1921, the small club has limited resources and has relied largely on local talent, but still managed two decades of play in the tier III Amateur Oberliga Südwest and Regionalliga West/Südwest and earned a national amateur title in 1990.

History
In 1925, they became part of the Deutschen Jugendkraft, a Catholic-sponsored national league, playing as DJK Salmrohr/Dörbach. The modern-day side was formed following World War II in 1946 as SV Salmrohr. It was renamed Fussball Club Salmrohr 1946 the following year and took on the name Fußballsportverein Salmrohr/Dörbach in 1957.

Through the 1980s and 1990s, FSV was as an upper table side in third division play and earned a single season promotion to the 2. Bundesliga in the 1986–87 following their qualification round win over SSV Ulm 1846. In 1990, they beat Rheydter SV 2:0 to claim the national amateur championship. The team again qualified for promotion play following their 1992 Oberliga title, but were beaten by Wuppertaler SV. Between 1992–96, Salmrohr captured five consecutive regional cup titles, however, in the late-1990s the club's performances began to tail off and they slipped to lower level competition.

An attempt to give Eintracht Trier a boost into the 2.Bundesliga in 1997 through a partial union that saw a number of Salmrohrs footballers go to Trier failed. The next year the club only escaped relegation because a pair of teams that finished ahead of them were denied licenses due to their financial problems. By the turn of the millennium Salmrohr was playing in the Oberliga Südwest as a fourth division side.

Most recently the team drifted between the Oberliga Südwest and the Rheinlandliga, winning another promotion in 2011 and finishing sixth in the Oberliga in 2012. From 2012–13 the Oberliga Südwest was renamed Oberliga Rheinland-Pfalz/Saar, with Salmrohr continuing in this league. It came second in the league in 2013 and 2014 and narrowly missed out on promotion when it lost to FC Nöttingen in the newly introduced promotion round of the Oberliga runners-up.

Honours
The club's honours:

League
 German amateur championship Winners: 1990
 Oberliga Rheinland-Pfalz/Saar (III)
 Champions: 1985, 1992
 Runners-up: 2013, 2014
 Rheinlandliga (VI)
 Champions: 2011
 Runners-up: 2005, 2006, 2009

Cup
 Rhineland Cup' (Tiers III-VII)
 Winners: 1989, 1992, 1993, 1994, 1995, 1996, 2002, 2015, 2019
 Runners-up: 1983, 1984, 1986, 1988

Recent seasons
The recent season-by-season performance of the club:

With the introduction of the Regionalligas in 1994 and the 3. Liga in 2008 as the new third tier, below the 2. Bundesliga, all leagues below dropped one tier. In 2012 the Oberliga Südwest was renamed Oberliga Rheinland-Pfalz/Saar.

References

External links
 Official website 
 The Abseits Guide to German Soccer
 FSV Salmrohr at Weltfussball.de
 Das deutsche Fußball-Archiv historical German domestic league tables 

Football clubs in Germany
Football clubs in Rhineland-Palatinate
Association football clubs established in 1921
1921 establishments in Germany
Bernkastel-Wittlich
2. Bundesliga clubs